The Honourable Mary Montagu-Scott (born 16 November 1964) is the daughter of Edward Douglas-Scott-Montagu, 3rd Baron Montagu of Beaulieu (1926–2015) and his first wife Belinda Crossley.

Early life and family 
Hon. Mary Montagu-Scott has one sibling from her parents’ marriage, Ralph Douglas-Scott-Montagu, 4th Baron Montagu of Beaulieu. He is the current Baron Montagu of Beaulieu.
Her parents divorced in 1974, and her father married his second wife, Fiona Margaret Herbert, in the same year. They have a son, Hon. Jonathan Deane Douglas-Scott-Montagu.

Career 
Mary Montagu-Scott trained in Theatre Design at the Central School of Art and Design, London. She set up Mary Montagu Designs, an interior design business working on many residential and commercial design projects.

She is the chairman of the New Forest Heritage Centre Trust, which runs the New Forest Heritage Centre, a trustee of the National Motor Museum Trust, a trustee of The National Museum of the Royal Navy, and a trustee of The Medusa Trust.

She is currently the director of Beaulieu Enterprises Ltd, Beaulieu  and a Board member of the New Forest Agricultural Show Society.

She is also a patron of both Oakhaven Hospice  and the Maritime Archaeology Trust. 

From April 2017 until April 2018 , she served as High Sheriff of Hampshire.

She became a Deputy Lieutenant of Hampshire in 2018

Personal life 
Mary Montagu-Scott is married to Rupert Scott. They have two children.

References 

1964 births
Living people
British interior designers
High Sheriffs of Hampshire
Daughters of barons